Temple shipbuilders was a family business in North East England during the late eighteenth century and the early nineteenth century.

Simon Temple, the Elder
Simon Temple (1728–1805) was born in Crayke, North Yorkshire. By 1780 he was advertising himself as a shipwright in South Shields.

Simon Temple, the Younger
Simon Temple (1759–1815) also born in Crayke opened a shipbuilding yard in Thrift Street, South Shields, and established a colliery in Jarrow.

William Smoult Temple
Was a shipbuilder at Jarrow (1811 - 1812).

Ships

Merchant vessels
 
 , an East Indiaman
 
 
 
 
 
 
 
 
 
 
 
 
 , an East Indiaman
 Lord Melville, see 
 
 
 
 
 
 Warrior, see

Naval vessels
 
 , name ship of her class 
 , built as HMS Queen Mab but renamed
 , sixth-rate post ship
 Pandour, renamed , before launch; sixth-rate
 , a frigate

References

18th-century English businesspeople
19th-century English businesspeople
English shipwrights